Sultan Mahmud Mirza ( 1453 – January 1495) was a prince of Timurid branch of Transoxiana, son of Abu Sa'id Mirza.

Biography
His father gave him the government of Hisar and Termez in 1459 (according to Babur Astarabad), but lost to Sultan Husayn Mirza Bayqara according Babur gave two major battles: at Astarabad, where he was defeated and Chikman (Sarai) near Andikhud equally defeated, around 1465, returning to Herat. His father restored in 1466. His father made an expedition to the Azerbaijan in 1468, but was defeated in the winter of 1468 to 1469 and was taken prisoner and was executed on 5 February 1469. Sultan Mahmud left his government to Herat with the support of Qambar Ali Beg, Governor of Hisar, who had accompanied Abu Sa'id had returned to Iraq; Mahmud came to this city with an army on 16 March but approaching Prince Hussain Baykara, another branch of the Timurid, with the help of the Uzbeks, had to remove it and Baykara Sultan proclaimed the 24th of March 1469. Sultan Ahmad Mirza, who ruled in Samarkand where he was and had been proclaimed sultan brother (father and mother) of Sultan Mahmud, marched from the capital determined to reconquer Herat, but after an interview with his brother Mahmoud, who had arrived in Samarkand, withdrew. Then Amir Khusraw and Qambar Ali Shah, with the consent of Sultan Mirza Ahmad, took him to Hisar to rule there and later dominated the territories south of Quhqa (Quhlugha) and mountains to the Hindu Kohtin Kush Range, including Termez, Caghaniyan, Hisan, Khuttalan, Kunduz and Badakhshan.

In 1470 Sultan Mahmud Mirza of Hisar and Umar Shaikh Mirza II of Andijan (Fergana) allied to attack Samarkand but through the mediation of a religious leader they have agreed to make peace. 1471 the hakim of Balkh, Ahmad Mushtak (or Mushtaq), known as Khoja Ahrar, revolted and Mirza Mahmud was going to support Balkh in person. Hussain Baykara besieged Balkh for four months. It is not known when Baykara recovered Balkh.

In 1479 he killed his brother Mirza Abu Bakr, and took control of Badakhshan, Kunduz, Khuttalan and Caghaniyan. Upon the death of his brother Sultan Ahmad Mirza of Samarkand in the middle of July 1494, less than two difference in the death of another brother Umar Shaikh Mirza of Andijan and Ferghana Valley (8 June 1494), Mirza Mahmud was presented to Samarkand and proclaimed sultan. It was well known that there was no living children Ahmad Mirza either because they were too young, and ruled six months, dying of disease then in January 1495 at age 43 (within eight months died three brothers).

According Baber was twice Kafiristan, south of Badakhshan, and made holy war and this was called Sultan Mahmud Ghazi. The emirs began to dispute the power to the middle of the sons of princes Umar Shaikh Mirza, including Babur, founder of the Mughal Empire, and the children of Mirza Mahmud.

Death and aftermath
Sultan Mahmud Mirza died in 1495. His son Mirza Baysoonkar, ascended the throne at Samarkand.

Family
Consorts
Mahmud had seven consorts:
Khanzada Begum, daughter of Mir Buzurg of Termez;
Pasha Begum, daughter of Ali Sher Beg, an amir of Kara Koyunlu, and widow of Muhammadi Mirza Aqqoyunlu;
Khanzada Begum, granddaughter of Mir Buzurg, the daughter of a brother of Khanzada Begum;
Sultan Nigar Khanum, daughter of Yunus Khan;
Zuhreh Begi Agha, an Uzbek, and Mahmud's principle concubine;
Mother of Rajab Sultan Begum;
Mother of Mohib Sultan Begum;

Sons
He had five sons: 
Sultan Masud Mirza (son of Khanzada Begum) 
Baysunghur Mirza (son of Pasha Begum);
Sultan Ali Mirza (son of Zuhra Begi Agha);
Husayn Mirza (died at the age of thirteen, son of the second Khanzada Begum);
Sultan Ways Mirza known as Mirza Khan (son of Sultan Nigar Khanum);

Daughters
He had eleven daughters:
Khanzada Begum, married firstly to Mirza Abu Bakr Dughlat, married secondly to Sayyid Muhammad Mirza (daughter of the second Khanzada Begum);
Ak Begum (daughter of the second Khanzada Begum);
Ai Begum, married to Jahangir Mirza, brother of Babur (daughter of the second Khanzada Begum);
Bega Begum, married to Haider Mirza, son of Sultan Husayn Mirza Bayqara (daughter of the second Khanzada Begum);
Zainab Sultan Begum, married to Babur (daughter of the second Khanzada Begum);
A daughter, married to Malik Muhammad Mirza, son of Manuchir Mirza son of Sultan Muhammad Mirza (daughter of Pasha Begum);
Makhdum Sultan Begum (daughter of Zuhra Begi Agha);
Rajab Sultan Begum (daughter of a concubine);
Mohib Sultan Begum (daughter of a concubine);
Two unnamed other daughters by Pasha Begum;

Ancestry

References
History of civilizations of Central Asia, Volum 4, Unesco
 ʻUbayd Allāh ibn Maḥmūd Aḥrār, The letters of Khwāja ʻUbayd Allāh Aḥrār and his associates
 Mirza Muhammad Haidar Dughlt, A History of the Moghuls of Central Asia: The Tarikh-I-Rashidi

1453 births
1495 deaths
Timurid monarchs
15th-century monarchs in Asia
People from Samarkand